P600 may refer to:
 P600 (neuroscience), an event-related potential or peak in electrical brain activity measured by electroencephalography
 P600 NEMA contact ratings, the contact rating of smaller NEMA contactors and relays
 Sendo P600, a model of mobile phone manufactured by Sendo
 An identifier for Interleukin 13, a cytokine protein
 P600 (mountain), a classification for mountains, used in the British Isles